Cibinong Station is a railway station located in Pabuaran, Cibinong, Bogor Regency, West Java.The station is located at an altitude of +121 meters, and is included in the Jakarta Operation Area I. Not far from the station (6 km) is located an international Pakansari Stadium.

The origins of the construction of this station can be traced to the master plan for the construction of the Jakarta Outer Ring Railway line made by the Ministry of Transportation of the Republic of Indonesia in the early 1990s. The goal is that freight trains do not enter the Special Capital Region of Jakarta area. The route is from Parung Panjang Station to Cikarang Station. However, the 1997 Asian financial crisis caused the plan to stop halfway, so the rail line only reached Nambo station. To fill this empty route slot, the Nambo diesel multiple unit ( or KRD) line was operated from 1999 to 2006. In 2006, the KRD line stopped operating because the DMUs was old and unfit for operation. Automatically, all stations and tracks were also deactivated.

After being inactive for several years, PT KAI decided to reactivate this line station considering that this line is a strategic railroad line and is close to the largest industrial areas in Bogor, namely Cibinong and Gunung Putri. This line is also installed with an overhead line, so that if this line is active again, the KRL Commuterline can serve it. This line is passed by freight trains which began operating on 4 December 2013. This station has served KRL Commuterline with the Nambo–Angke route since 1 April 2015.

Building and layout 
This station has two railway tracks, with line 1 as a straight track.

Services
The following is a list of train services at the Cibinong Station.

Passenger services 
 KAI Commuter

References

Bogor Regency
Railway stations in West Java
Railway stations opened in 1997